William Alfred Hunt (26 August 1908 – 30 December 1983) was an Australian cricketer who played in one Test match in 1932.

References

1908 births
1983 deaths
Australia Test cricketers
New South Wales cricketers
Australian cricketers
Cricketers from Sydney